The 15th Irish Film & Television Academy Awards took place at the Mansion House on 15 February 2018 in Dublin, honoured Irish film and television drama released in 2017. Deirdre O'Kane host the film awards ceremony.

The nominations for the IFTA Film & Drama Awards were announced by the Irish Film and Television Academy. Winners are denoted by bold letters.

Film

Feature film
Michael Inside
 Cardboard Gangsters
 Handsome Devil
 The Killing of a Sacred Deer
 Maudie
 Song of Granite

Director
Aisling Walsh – Maudie
 Frank Berry – Michael Inside
 John Butler – Handsome Devil
 Martin McDonagh – Three Billboards Outside Ebbing, Missouri
 Mark O Connor –  Cardboard Gangsters

Scriptwriter
Martin McDonagh – Three Billboards Outside Ebbing, Missouri
 Frank Berry – Michael Inside
 Stephen Burke – Maze
 John Butler – Handsome Devil
 Nick Kelly – The Drummer and The Keeper

Actor in a leading role
John Connors – Cardboard Gangsters
 Colin Farrell – The Killing of a Sacred Deer
 Dafhyd Flynn – Michael Inside
 Fionn O'Shea – Handsome Devil
 Tom Vaughan-Lawlor – Maze

Actress in a leading role
Saoirse Ronan – Lady Bird
 Sarah Bolger – Halal Daddy
 Ann Skelly – Kissing Candice

Actor in a supporting role
Barry Keoghan – The Killing of a Sacred Deer
 Jacob McCarthy – The Drummer and The Keeper
 Andrew Scott – Handsome Devil
 Fionn Walton – Cardboard Gangsters
 Barry Ward – Maze

Actress in a supporting role
Victoria Smurfit – The Lears
 Niamh Algar – The Drummer and The Keeper
 Sarah Carroll – The Limit Of
 Deirdre O Kane – Halal Daddy
 Fionna Hewitt Twamley – Cardboard Gangsters

George Morrison Feature Documentary
The Farthest
 The 34th
 A Cambodian Spring
 No Stone Unturned
 The Silver Branch

Short film – Live action
Wave
 Cry Rosa
 For You
 Lily
 The Secret Market
 The Tattoo
 Time Traveller

Animated short film
Late Afternoon
 An Beal Bocht
 Angela's Christmas
 Departure

Craft

Original music
Stephen McKeon – Pilgrimage
 Ray Harman – The Farthest
 Stephen Rennicks – Maze
 John Gerard Walsh – The Drummer and The Keeper

Editing
Una Ni DhonghaIle – Three Girls
 Tony Cranstoun – The Farthest
 Dermot Diskin – Peaky Blinders
 Tadhg O Sullivan – Song of Granite

Production Design
John Hand – Maudie
 Stephen Daly – Into the Badlands
 Joe Fallover – The Lodgers
 Mark Geraghty – Vikings

Cinematography
Seamus McGarvey – The Greatest Showman
 Tom Comerford – Pilgrimage
 Richard Kendrick – Song of Granite
 Cathal Watters – Peaky Blinders

Costume Design
Consolata Boyle – Victoria and Abdul
 Sarajane Ffrench O Carroll – The Lodgers
 Susan O Connor Cave – Vikings
 Leonie Prendergast – Pilgrimage

Make Up/Hair
Clare Lambe & Sevlene Roddy – Into the Badlands
 Julie-Ann Ryan & Niamh Glynn – The Cured
 Lorraine Glynn & Sonya Dolan – The Man Who Invented Christmas
 Dee Corcoran & Tom McInerney – Vikings

Sound
Steve Fanagan, Kieran Horgan – The Farthest
 Ronan Hill, Onnalee Blank, Mathew Waters – Game of Thrones
 Karl Merren, Brendan Deasy – Into the Badlands
 Marco Dolle, Steve Munro, Garret Farrel – Maudie

VFX
Tailored Films & Bowsie Workshop – The Lodgers
 Tim Chauncey – The Ash Lad: In the Hall of the Mountain King
 Ian Benjamin Kenny, Enda O Connor – The Farthest
 Ed Bruce & Nicholas Murphy, Screenscene – Game of Thrones

International categories

International film
Three Billboards Outside Ebbing, Missouri
 Dunkirk
 Lady Bird
 The Shape of Water

International actor
Ethan Hawke – Maudie
 Timothée Chalamet – Call Me by Your Name
 Gary Oldman – Darkest Hour
 Sam Rockwell – Three Billboards Outside Ebbing, Missouri

International actress
Frances McDormand – Three Billboards Outside Ebbing, Missouri

 Sally Hawkins – Maudie
 Sally Hawkins – The Shape of Water
 Nicole Kidman – The Killing of a Sacred Deer

Television drama

Drama
Game of Thrones
 Acceptable Risk
 Line of Duty
 Paula
 Striking Out
 Vikings

Director
Dearbhla Walsh – Fargo
 David Caffrey – Peaky Blinders
 Rob Quinn – Ackley Bridge
 Steve Saint Leger – Vikings

Scriptwriter
Conor McPherson – Paula
 Ronan Bennett – Gunpowder
 Malcolm Campbell – Ackley Bridge
 Antoine O Flatharta – Grace Harte

Actor in a leading role
Cillian Murphy – Peaky Blinders
 Richard Dormer – Rellik
 Adrian Dunbar – Line Of Duty
 Brendan Gleeson – Mr. Mercedes
 Chris O'Dowd – Get Shorty

Actress in a leading role
Caitriona Balfe – Outlander
 Elaine Cassidy – Acceptable Risk
 Denise Gough – Paula
 Amy Huberman – Striking Out
 Ruth Negga – Preacher

Actor in a supporting roleLiam Cunningham – Game of Thrones Moe Dunford – Vikings
 Aidan Gillen – Game of Thrones
 Owen McDonnell – Paula
 Jason O'Mara – Marvel's Agents of S.H.I.E.L.D.

Actress in a supporting roleCharlie Murphy – Peaky Blinders' Angeline Ball – Acceptable Risk Eva Birthistle – The Last Kingdom Jessie Buckley – Taboo Genevieve O’Reilly – Tin Star''

References

External links
2018 Awards at the Irish Film and Television Academy official website

2018 in Irish television
15
2018 film awards
2018 television awards